The canton of Thoiry is an administrative division of the Ain department, in eastern France. It was created at the French canton reorganisation which came into effect in March 2015. Its seat is in Thoiry.

It consists of the following communes:
 
Challex 
Chevry
Chézery-Forens
Collonges
Crozet
Échenevex
Farges
Léaz
Lélex
Mijoux
Péron
Pougny
Saint-Jean-de-Gonville
Ségny
Sergy
Thoiry

References

Cantons of Ain